Peter Thompson (born 16 February 1936) is an English former footballer who played as a centre forward. He played most of his career as a full professional in the English Football League, however did make appearances for England Amateur during his amateur playing days.

Career
Starting out at hometown club Blackhall Colliery Welfare, Thompson was signed by Wrexham as an amateur.

He spent two years at the Welsh club, with an impressive record of a goal every two games.

In 1957, he moved to Hartlepool United, where in his first season he was their top scorer with 16 goals.

His form earned him a move to Derby County in 1958, where he spent 4 years.

In 1962, he moved to Bournemouth, where he spent a season before returning to Hartlepool.

His second spell at Hartlepool was a success, being their top scorer again for the 1963–64 and 1964–65 seasons. In 1966 he left Hartlepool to join non-league side Boston United.

References

1936 births
Living people
Blackhall Colliery Welfare F.C. players
Wrexham A.F.C. players
Hartlepool United F.C. players
Derby County F.C. players
AFC Bournemouth players
Boston United F.C. players
English footballers
Association football forwards
England amateur international footballers
People from Blackhall Colliery
Footballers from County Durham